Kursk is the name of several inhabited localities in Russia.

Urban localities
Kursk, a city in Kursk Oblast

Rural localities
Kursk, Altai Krai, a selo in Kursky Selsoviet of Kulundinsky District in Altai Krai; 
Kursk (settlement), Leningrad Oblast, a settlement in Kurskoye Settlement Municipal Formation of Volosovsky District in Leningrad Oblast; 
Kursk (village), Leningrad Oblast, a village in Kurskoye Settlement Municipal Formation of Volosovsky District in Leningrad Oblast;